The Derdepoort massacre occurred on 25 November 1899 in Derdepoort, North-West South African Republic on the border with the British Bechuanaland Protectorate. Some of the Bechuanaland Kgatla, under their chief Lentshwe and in alliance with the British under Colonel G. L. Holdsworth, attacked a Boer laager (wagon fort). Two women were killed, and 17 women and children taken captive.

See also
 List of massacres in South Africa

References

1899 in military history
1899 in South Africa
Mass murder in 1899
November 1899 events
Massacres in 1899
Massacres in South Africa
Second Boer War crimes
1899 murders in Africa